Alessandro Atzeni (born 1 January 1980 in Florence) is a retired Italian footballer. He played as a striker. After playing in Fiorentina youth teams, he made his debut in Serie A in 1998. After that he played in Serie B with Genoa and in lower series with Montevarchi, Pisa and Castel di Sangro.

Career
1997–1998 Fiorentina 2 (0) 
1998–1999 Southampton 0 (0) 
1999–2001 Genoa 6 (1) 
2001 Montevarchi 12 (6) 
2001–2002 Pisa 5 (0) 
2002–2003 Castel di Sangro 8 (1)
2003–2004 Nuova Chiusi 3 (0) 
2004–2005 Poggibonsi 9 (3)

References

External links
 lega-calcio.it
 

1980 births
Living people
Italian footballers
Serie B players
ACF Fiorentina players
Genoa C.F.C. players
Montevarchi Calcio Aquila 1902 players
Pisa S.C. players
A.S.D. Castel di Sangro Calcio players
U.S. Poggibonsi players
Association football forwards